Scott Wilson is a former professional rugby league footballer who played in the 1980s.

Playing career

Championship appearances
Scott Wilson played in 33 (1 as a substitute) and scored 5 tries in Halifax's total of 37 games (30 League plus 7 in Cup competitions) in Halifax's victory in the Championship during the 1985–86 season.

Challenge Cup Final appearances
Scott Wilson played , i.e. number 2, in Halifax's 19–18 victory over St. Helens in the 1987 Challenge Cup Final during the 1986–87 season at Wembley Stadium, London on Saturday 2 May 1987, in front of a crowd of 91,267.

References

External links

Halifax R.L.F.C. players
Living people
Place of birth missing (living people)
Rugby league centres
Rugby league wingers
Year of birth missing (living people)